Annacloy River is a river in County Down, Northern Ireland, which goes through Dromara Hills and Strangford Lough.

Course
The Ballynahinch River, flowing east through Ballynahinch, and the Carson's Dam River, flowing south through Crossgar, join at Kilmore, and the united stream is called the Annacloy River, and lower down the River Quoile, falling into the southwest angle of Strangford Lough near Downpatrick.

Between Annacloy to Stranford Lough, the Annacloy is renamed to the River Quoile.

See also
 Rivers of Ireland
 List of rivers of Northern Ireland

References

Rivers of County Down